Badnagar is a town, and a municipality in Ujjain district in the state of Madhya Pradesh, India. Badnagar Tehsil Headquarters is Badnagar town and it belongs to Ujjain Division. It is located 45 km towards west from District headquarters Ujjain. 244 km from the state capital, Bhopal, towards the east and 72 km from Indore.

Badnagar is also famous for its fort, Amla Fort.

Geography 
Badnagar is situated on the bank of river Chamla. Badnagar Tehsil is bounded by Badnawar Tehsil towards west, Depalpur Tehsil towards the south, Khachrod Tehsil towards north, Ujjain district towards the east. Indore City, Ujjain City, Ratlam City, Dhar City nearby cities to Badnagar. Badnagar consists of 196 villages and 108 Panchayats. This place is on the border of Ujjain and Dhar Districts. Dhar District, Badnawar, is west of this place. Sundrabad is located 13 km away from Badnagar.

Demographics 

As of the 2011 Census of India, Badnagar had a population of 2,69,573. Among all population no. of males are 1,37,685 and no. of females are 1,31,888. Number of literates in Badnagar are 1,69,935. Among all literates, the number of males is 1,00,562 and the number of females is 69,373 and the total number of illiterates here is 99,638. 38,158 people of the population is under 6 years of age.

Climate

It is hot in summer. Badnagar summer highest day temperature is in between 30 °C to 42 °C .

Average temperatures of January is 19 °C, February is 22 °C, March is 28 °C, April is 32 °C, May is 35 °C

Transportation
Badnagar is well connected by road and rail with cities like Ujjain, Indore and Ratlam. state highway 18 (dewas to badnawar). Passes through Badnagar which connects it with Ujjain, Bhopal, Dewas and Ahmedabad via Dahod. Badnagar railway station is situated on ratlam-indore section of Indian Railways. Nearest airport is Indore airport.

Education
Educational institutes in Badnagar teach in both English and Hindi. There are two colleges in Badnagar.

Schools
Shree Digamber jain sanmati vidhiya mander badnagar
SHREE SHARDA HR.SEC.SCHOOL (since 1980).
Saraswati Vidhya Mandir Badnagar
Unique Public School Badnagar
St. Thomas Hr. Sec. School (since 1974) Badnagar (the first private school of Badnagar)
Jain Public School Badnagar 
Vidhyanjali International School 
St. Martin's Hr. Sec. School Badnagar

Colleges
Govt. College Badnagar

Health
Many people from nearby cities come to Badnagar for cheap medical treatment of kidney stones and other surgeries. Barnagar is well-known for its treatment of paralysis.
Some hospitals are:
 Kabra Hospital
 Geeta Hospital
 Civil Hospital
 City Hospital
 Ashok hospital
 Gupta hospital
 Shrivastava Hospital
 iLife Clincs & Research Pvt Ltd

Culture
Badnagar is also famous for its dishes, most famous among them being Bhutte ke Laddu, Dal Biscuit and for its guavas. Badnagar is the birthplace of national poet Kavi Pradeep. Former Indian Prime Minister Atal Bihari Vajpayee spent some of his childhood time in Badnagar. Another famous poet from Badnagar is Ibrahim Khan Gauri, the lyricist of hit movies of Rakesh Roshan like Kaho Naa... Pyaar Hai and Koi... Mil Gaya.

References

Cities and towns in Ujjain district